Henrie Mutuku is a Kenyan Gospel Singer.

Early life

Mutuku was born in Nairobi in 1978, the firstborn with three brothers to Mr. and Mrs. Mutuku. She grew up in the Eastlands, a densely populated area in Nairobi inhabited by generally low income residents, and from a very young age was exposed to a diverse range of music styles including R&B, Reggae, Rap, Benga, Lingala and other African blends of music.

Henrie Mutuku's love affair with music was evident quite early in life when at the age of 5 she would sing in family gatherings, church, and nursery school. Later, when she was slightly older, it was the church choir where her talents for music were obvious and enhanced. She has also sung in the local church worship team, Christian Union, singing groups such as More Than Conquerers (MTC) and Prayer Partners (PPs).

Her Christian upbringing in the Eastlands suburb of Nairobi has influenced her style of music as she uses Swahili, English, her mother tongue Kamba and Sheng (a concurrence of English, Swahili and local, vernacular dialects) to express herself and communicate to her audience.  Since then, she has grown to use basic Amharic and French, mainly due to the influence of Ethiopian and Congolese refugees living in her environs.

In upper primary school she toyed with the idea of making music her career choice and as an active member of the Drama Club and Choir mistress in Loreto High School, Limuru, her love and interest in music was solidified.

She is fluent in Swahili, English, Kamba (her mother-tongue) and Sheng.

Music career

Henrie started working in music with local Christian artists like Izzo and Pete Odera as a background vocalist. She later featured predominantly in a 2002 compilation album 'Rebirth' produced by Soul Child Inc. Her career was catapulted after dual winning the KORA 2002 Best Artiste East Africa (with Eric Wainaina).

Henrie Mutuku's debut album was Simama ("Stand") which has gone on to contribute hit songs like "Usichoke" (featuring Roughtone and R.K) and "Manzi wa Maana" (featuring K.J. of Redykulass-a Kenyan comedy troupe). She has also featured prominently in popular music countdown radio shows like Kiss 100's "Smirnoff Top 7 songs in Nairobi", East Africa FM Radio's 'Link' and Kampala FM as voted by listeners. 'Manzi wa Maana' especially captured the hearts of young ladies, swiftly becoming an anthem of chastity and virtue, all the while redefining the true essence of a beautiful African woman. She has since recorded another music video for the song "Amini", taken off her album Simama.

Henrie Mutuku has curtain raised for Bebo Norman at two concerts, allowing her to make her first music video, "Nakuhitaji" (I Need You), created by the local Family T.V. for the promotion of the Bebo Norman Tour. She then recorded yet another music video for the song "Amini" (Believe), a feature in her album Simama.

In 2003 she won two Kisima Awards for Best Female Artiste and Best Contemporary Gospel Artiste. She was also nominated for a KORA Award in 2003.

Henrie Mutuku, after being away from the music scene for almost 10 years (from 2004), came back in 2014 with a new track by the name "Langu" off the album Tena (Again). In February 2017, Henrie officially launched the Tena album, a continuation of her first Simama album, for which she was reported to indicate that it is "different because she did not limit herself and tried new sounds and worked with a different producer, one David Higham."

Her name, Henrie, is in honour of her late uncle Henry Musyoki Kilonzi whom she describes as a generous man who desired for all of them to live in an honest and humble way.

Inspiration

She draws her inspiration from the Word of God, testimonies of believers around her and other prominent Gospel musicians like Mary Atieno, female hymnwriters like Fanny J. Crosby and hymn translator Catherine Winkworth. She is greatly inspired by the hymn books, 'Hymns of Faith' by Scripture Union, 'Tenzi za Rohoni' by Lifeway for Baptist Convention of Kenya, Buruburu Baptist Church Songbook, 'Baptist Hymnal' by the Convention Press, an outfit of the Southern Baptist Convention in the US and 'Mbathi sya Kumutaia Ngai' by Ukambani Christian Literature. She is learning hymns in Kikuyu and open to learning from other ethnicities as well.

She testifies of God's faithfulness in Jesus Christ who has enabled her to grow in song writing, piano playing, strong vocals, faithfulness in service and fulfilled her lifelong dream to be a hymnwriter, albeit an amateur hymnwriter.

Songs

Songs written by Henrie Mutuku include:

 Simama (2002)
 "Nakuhitaji"
 "Manzi wa Maana"
 "Usichoke" (Co-written by Rufftone and RKay)
 "Amini"
 "Kunaye Mungu"
 "Ona"
 "Songa Mbele"
 Tena (2014)
 "Langu" (4 April 2014)
 "Naomba" (31 March 2015)
 "Usife Moyo" (9 June 2018)
 Singles
 Featured in Rufftone's "Mola Wangu"
 Featured in Davie's "Nisaidie Yesu"
 "Chafua"
 "Aiyoh" with Eddie Ivan Kaweera and Papy Mpiana
 "Harusi" with Reuben Kigame

Discography

The following is a list by year of albums released by Henrie Mutuku.

The Tena Album won an 8-star rating at Cross Rhythms, UK.

Literary Work

Henrie Mutuku has also written articles on the blog UlizaLinks.co.ke discussing Christian approaches to life issues and current events, and insights in gospel music ministry. The articles include:

 Did You Know The World's Worst Kept SECRET?
 How Do I Start?
 Reason Why You Need To Bless But Not Curse Those Who Harm You.
 Important Things You Need To Do To Live In Harmony With Others.
 What Inspired the song "Naomba"
 How CHRISTIANS Should Respond To The Stark And Grotesque GARISSA Attack
 So You Want To LET Go?
 The DREAMS Of Garissa University Survivors Did NOT Die But Were Actually REBORN
 Aren't Mothers Special? My Mother Used To Distribute My CD's To Retailers
 Why YOU Need To Submit To The Governing Authorities
 To All Leaders – God Is Your Boss!
 The 5 Internal Conflicts of a Gospel Artiste
 Part 2: The 5 Internal Conflicts of a Gospel Artiste
 Part 3: The 5 Internal Conflicts of a Gospel Artiste
 Part 4: The 5 Internal Conflicts of a Gospel Artiste
 Part 5: The 5 Internal Conflicts of a Gospel Artiste
 The 5 Internal Conflicts of a Gospel Artiste: Bonus Issue
 Be Distinct – Lessons From August Landmesser

She also completed her manuscript for her book "God of Woman" in 2019.

Personal life

Henrie Mutuku, is certainly more serious about her faith in the Lord Jesus Christ than anything else, including her music, a decision she made while still a child. This was clearly highlighted during her acceptance speech at the Kora Award 2002 where she credited God the Father, God the Son and God the Holy Spirit for the Kora Award before going on to recognise other colleagues who helped her along the way.

She believed in Jesus Christ as her Lord and Saviour, The Friend that sticks closer than a brother, The Author and Perfector of her faith at the age of six years during a school holiday at her parents' home. She was baptised at 17 by immersion. She is a registered member of Buruburu Baptist Church.

Henrie Mutuku married her fiancé, Pastor Charles Maina Njau, on 21 April 2014.

Achievements

The following is a list by year of Mutuku's achievements:

Other Activities
She has been involved in Christian values campaigns like 'Protecting life Movement' movement and abstinence campaigns which in turn supports the war against HIV/AIDS, performing in events that highlight these pertinent issues. She loves to evangelise to all that she meets because she sees music as her tool of opening doors to share the gospel of Jesus Christ. She enjoys music that is rich in God's Word and is a strong proponent of Colossians 3:16 KJV.

Her talent has also come in handy in promotion of Bible Translation Literacy and Bible League work, two organisations involved in advancement of Bible literacy in Kenya and surrounding regions.

See also
Music of Kenya
Gospel music
Kisima Music Awards

References

External links
Official Website

Kenyan gospel musicians
Kisima Music Award winners
1978 births
Living people